Whittier Trust Company is an American independent wealth management and investment firm. A multi-family office, it stems from the family office founded by the children of Max Whittier. Whittier co-founded and developed Beverly Hills in the early 1900s, and co-founded Belridge Oil in 1911.

History
The Whittier family office was one of the first family offices in the United States. It was established in 1935 by Leland, Don, Helen, and Paul Whittier to manage their assets and later their philanthropic efforts.  A significant percentage of the Whittier family's fortune was on paper until 1979, when Belridge Oil was sold to Shell Oil for $3.6 billion.  It was the largest corporate acquisition in history at the time.

In 1989, Whittier Trust Company was created as a California state-chartered trust company, and began to offer investment, wealth management, fiduciary, family office, and philanthropic services to other families. In 1994, an affiliate company, The Whittier Trust Company of Nevada, Inc. was formed in Reno, Nevada to take advantage of the state's favorable tax and trust laws. As of 2021, Whittier Trust managed assets of more than $18 bn. for more than 40 foundations and 480 ultra high-net-worth families.

Whittier Trust is the oldest and largest multi-family office headquartered on the West Coast, with offices in South Pasadena, Costa Mesa, and San Francisco, California; Reno, Nevada; Seattle, Washington; and Portland Oregon. To reflect the Whittier family history, it maintains a strong focus on philanthropy, and remains actively involved in energy and real estate investments.

In 2021, Whittier Trust was named one of the Top 5 Multi-Family Offices Worldwide by the Society of Trust and Estate Practitioners (STEP). Whittier was the only company with offices in the Western United States recognized on the STEP finalists list.

References

External links
 Whittier Trust website 

Financial services companies of the United States